Ernest Wesley Young (born July 8, 1969) is an American former professional baseball outfielder and current coach for the United States national baseball team. He played in parts of eight seasons in Major League Baseball (MLB) for five different teams, primarily the Oakland Athletics. He also played one season in Japan for the Yokohama BayStars, and was a member of the United States' gold medal-winning baseball team at the 2000 Summer Olympics.

Playing career
In his major league career, Young played in 288 games, had 179 hits, 27 home runs, 90 RBI, 10 stolen bases, and a .225 batting average. In 2000, he led the Triple-A Memphis Redbirds with 35 home runs (second in the entire St. Louis Cardinals organization to Jim Edmonds' 42) and 98 RBIs (third in the organization behind Troy Farnsworth with 113 and Edmonds with 108). On June 12, 2006, he hit his 300th career minor league home run. As a member of the Oakland Athletics, in a game against the Tigers, Young started a triple play with a leaping catch in center field.

Minor league coach/manager
Following his retirement after the 2007 season, Young became the hitting coach on the Chicago White Sox' rookie-level team, the Great Falls Voyagers. On November 21, 2008, he was named the manager of the Kannapolis Intimidators for the 2009 season. In 2011, Young was tabbed to manage the West Michigan Whitecaps, the class A affiliate of the Detroit Tigers, a position he retained for the 2012 season, but not for 2013.

International career
As a player, Young won an Olympic gold medal as a member of the Team USA in baseball at the 2000 Summer Olympics, held in Sydney, Australia.

After his playing career ended, Young managed the national team for the 2011 Baseball World Cup (fourth-place finish) and 2011 Pan Am Games (second-place finish). Circa 2013, he served on the board of directors of USA Baseball.

In August 2019, Young became a national team coach for the 2019 WBSC Premier12 tournament. The team finished fourth in the tournament, and failed to qualify for the 2020 Olympics. In April 2021, Young was again named as a coach for the national team, for the team's final efforts to qualify for baseball at the 2020 Summer Olympics in Tokyo in 2021. The team qualified, with Young serving as hitting coach and first base coach for the Olympics. The team went on to win silver, falling to Japan in the gold-medal game.

References

External links
, or Retrosheet, or Pura Pelota (VPBL stats)

1969 births
Living people
African-American baseball coaches
African-American baseball managers
African-American baseball players
American expatriate baseball players in Canada
American expatriate baseball players in Japan
Arizona Diamondbacks players
Baseball players at the 2000 Summer Olympics
Baseball coaches from Illinois
Baseball players from Chicago
Buffalo Bisons (minor league) players
Charlotte Knights players
Cleveland Indians players
Detroit Tigers players
Edmonton Trappers players
Huntsville Stars players
Kansas City Royals players
Leones del Caracas players
Lewis Flyers baseball players
Madison Muskies players
Major League Baseball center fielders
Medalists at the 2000 Summer Olympics
Memphis Redbirds players
Modesto A's players
Minor league baseball managers
Navegantes del Magallanes players
American expatriate baseball players in Venezuela
Oakland Athletics players
Olympic gold medalists for the United States in baseball
Omaha Royals players
Portland Beavers players
Southern Oregon A's players
Tacoma Tigers players
Team USA players
Toledo Mud Hens players
Tucson Sidewinders players
United States national baseball team managers
Yokohama BayStars players
21st-century African-American people
20th-century African-American sportspeople